Peter Barry Brontë Gatenby (1923 – 24 August 2015 in Sandycove, County Dublin) was an Irish medical doctor,  Medical Director for the United Nations and Professor of Medicine at Trinity College Dublin. He was Ireland’s first full-time professor of clinical medicine.

Family
Gatenby was the son of the zoologist James Brontë Gatenby and was related to the Brontë family. He had a wife, Yvette, two children, Robin and Odette, and six grandchildren.

Career
Gattenby earned a bachelors in medicine degree in Trinity College in 1946. Following graduation he worked in a number of hospitals in Ireland and the UK. From 1953 to 1974, he worked as a consultant physician at Dr Steevens' Hospital. In 1960, he became the first full time professor of clinical medicine in Trinity College Dublin, becoming a fellow in 1965. In 1974, he also became Medical Director for the United Nations. From 1975 to 1978, he was Regius Professor of Physic, and was made an honorary fellow when he resigned in 1978. He continued at the United Nations until his retirement in 1987.

In 2002, the Peter Gatenby Award was founded at Trinity College Dublin.

Works
The school of physic: Trinity College Dublin : a retrospective view, 1994
History of the Meath Hospital, 1996

References

Donal G Weir, The Feds, An Account of the Federated Dublin Voluntary Hospitals 1961-2005

1923 births
2015 deaths
Irish educators
20th-century Irish medical doctors
Academics of Trinity College Dublin
Alumni of Trinity College Dublin
Brontë family
Fellows of Trinity College Dublin
Honorary Fellows of Trinity College Dublin
People from Sandycove